Dubianaclia quinquemacula is a moth of the subfamily Arctiinae. It was described by Paul Mabille in 1882. It is found in Madagascar.

Subspecies
Dubianaclia quinquemacula quinquemacula
Dubianaclia quinquemacula confusa Griveaud, 1969

References

Arctiinae
Moths described in 1882